KBQF is a class A radio station broadcasting to McFarland, California. The station is owned by Jab Broadcasting, LLC.

History
KBQF began broadcasting on January 17, 2007.

References

External links
 

2009 establishments in California
Mass media in Kern County, California
BQF
Radio stations established in 2009